Loving You is Where I Belong is an album by Harry Belafonte, released in 1981.

Track listing
 "Something to Hold Onto" (Gene Pistilli, Walter Murphy) – 3:55
 "Mary Makes Magic" (Hoyt Axton) – 5:58
 "The Rose" (Amanda McBroom) – 4:20
 "I Told You" (Jake Holmes) – 4:05
 "Streets of London" (Ralph McTell) – 5:03
 "Loving You is Where I Belong" (Steven Marc Cristol) – 4:25
 "Forever Young / Jabulani" (Bob Dylan / Caiphus Semenya, Harry Belafonte) – 4:16
 "I Don't Need Her" (Holmes) – 5:03
 "Did You Know" (Holmes) – 3:44
 "Genuine Imitation Life" (Holmes) – 4:35
1989 cd reissue bonus tracks:
 "Marching To The Fair" (Morris Goldberg, Shunmugan Pillay) – 5:44
 "Sunbird" (Pat Rosalia, Robert McKinnon) – 4:05

Personnel
 Harry Belafonte – vocals
 Jay Berliner – guitar
 Gene Bertoncini – guitar
 Don Brooks – harmonica
 Hiram Bullock – guitar
 Dan Carillo – guitar
 Jay McGeehan – guitar
 José Neto – cavaquinho, guitar
 John Cartwright – bass
 John Beal – bass
 Francisco Centano – bass
 Sal Cuevas – bass
 Bob Freedman – strings
 Morris Goldberg – saxophone
 Ross Levinson – violin
 Chris Parker – drums
 Brian Brake – drums
 Steve Thornton – percussion
 Arthur Williams – background vocals
Production notes:
 John Cartwright – producer
 Bob Freedman – producer, orchestration
 Harry Belafonte – executive producer
 Richard Cummings – musical director, orchestration
 David Belafonte – engineer, mixing
 Edmund Orsorio – engineer
 Wayne Yurhelum – engineer
 Gene Orloff – concert master
 David Nadien – concert master
 Eric Meola – Les Underhill
 Phyllis H. B. – design

References

1981 albums
Harry Belafonte albums
Columbia Records albums